Zick & Sharp, officially Walter Zick & Howard Sharp, was an American architectural firm from Las Vegas, Nevada, in business from 1949 to 1980. The partners were Walter Zick and Harris Sharp.

Partner biographies

Walter Frederick Zick was born in New York City on May 2, 1905. He was educated at the University of Southern California, obtaining a Bachelor of Architecture in 1928 and a Master of Education in 1932. By the late 1930s he had established an architect's office in Alhambra, California. In 1945 he joined the office of Richard Stadelman & Associates, of Las Vegas. Stadelman's firm, dealing with the Flamingo project, required a larger office staff, and Zick was hired originally for the year alone. However, he grew to love the valley, and remained for the remainder of his career. He left Stadelman in 1948, establishing a partnership with Harris Sharp in November 1949. Walter Zick was a partner in Zick & Sharp until his retirement in 1980. He died in 1990.

Harris Perry Sharp was born in El Paso, Texas on September 2, 1919. He was educated at the University of Arizona (1937–1938), University of New Mexico (1938–1940), and the University of Southern California, where he received a Bachelor of Architecture in 1943. He worked for L. L. Jone, Kenneth Wayne, and the W. C. Kruger Company. In 1947 he became a partner in the office of Las Vegas architect A. Lacey Worswick, who was formerly the city's leading practitioner. Sharp left Worswick's office in 1949 to partner with Walter Zick. Zick & Sharp remained in business until Zick's retirement in 1980. The office was succeeded by Harris Sharp & Associates.

Selected works

Zick & Sharp, 1949-1980
 1952 – Lomie G. Heard Elementary School, Nellis Air Force Base, Clark County, Nevada
 1955 – Moulin Rouge Hotel, 900 W Bonanza Rd, Las Vegas, Nevada
 Demolished in 2010
 1955 – Twin Lakes Shopping Center, 1048 N Rancho Dr, Las Vegas, Nevada
 1956 – Maude Frazier Hall, University of Nevada, Las Vegas, Nevada
 Demolished in 2008
 1957 – Hyde Park Middle School, Hinson St, Las Vegas, Nevada
 1957 – The Mint, 100 Fremont St, Las Vegas, Nevada
 1958 – Capehart Housing, Nellis Air Force Base, Clark County, Nevada
 1958 – Archie C. Grant Hall, University of Nevada, Las Vegas, Nevada
 1959 – Boulder City High School, 5th St, Boulder City, Nevada
 1961 – Clark County Courthouse, 200 S 3rd St, Las Vegas, Nevada
 With Welton Becket & Associates. Demolished.
 1965 – E. W. Clark High School, Pennwood Ave, Las Vegas, Nevada
 1966 – Harry C. Levy Gardens, 2525 W Washington Ave, Las Vegas, Nevada
 1966 – Valley High School, Burnham Ave, Las Vegas, Nevada
 1968 – First National Bank of Nevada Building, 302 E Carson Ave, Las Vegas, Nevada
 1970 – Flora Dungan Humanities Building, University of Nevada, Las Vegas, Nevada
 1975 – Nevada Savings and Loan Association Building, 201 S Las Vegas Blvd, Las Vegas, Nevada

Harris Sharp & Associates, from 1980
 1981 - B. Mahlon Brown Junior High School, 307 Cannes St, Henderson, Nevada
 1984 - Nevada Savings Financial Center, 330 W Sahara Ave, Las Vegas, Nevada

References

Architecture firms based in Nevada
Defunct architecture firms of the United States
Companies based in Las Vegas
Defunct companies based in Nevada
Design companies established in 1949
Design companies disestablished in 1980
1949 establishments in Nevada
1980 disestablishments in Nevada
History of Las Vegas